The Borsod Power Plant is one of Hungary's largest biomass power plants having an installed heat capacity of 140 MW and electric capacity of 40 MW.

External links

 Reference from AES Corporation

Biomass power stations in Hungary